Sid Ahmed Rafik Mazouzi (born February 1, 1989 in Algiers) is an Algerian football player who is currently playing as a goalkeeper for MC Oran in the Algerian Ligue Professionnelle 1.

International career
On November 16, 2011, Mazouzi was selected as part of Algeria's squad for the 2011 CAF U-23 Championship in Morocco.

References

External links
 
 USM-Alger.com Profile

1989 births
2011 CAF U-23 Championship players
Algerian footballers
Algeria youth international footballers
Algeria under-23 international footballers
Algerian Ligue Professionnelle 1 players
Living people
Footballers from Algiers
USM Alger players
WA Tlemcen players
RC Arbaâ players
CA Batna players
USM El Harrach players
MC Oran players
Association football goalkeepers
21st-century Algerian people